Brady's Escape is a Hungary-United States co-produced war film, written and directed by Pál Gábor. It was released in 1983 under several different titles: Hosszú vágta (Long Gallop) in Hungary, Brady's Escape in the US (1984) and The Long Ride in all other English-speaking territories.

It stars John Savage as an Air Force pilot shot down over German-controlled Hungary during World War II, and Kelly Reno as a cowboy-idolizing teenager who teams up with him.

Home video
As of February 2020, the film has only been released internationally on VHS under various titles and in the US on VHS and LaserDisc as Brady's Escape.

References

External links
 

1983 films
Hungarian war drama films
Hungarian-language films
Films directed by Pál Gábor